Nasdaq Market-Makers Antitrust Litigation - class-action lawsuit initiated in 1996 alleging collusion amongst Wall Street traders.  The class action alleged that NASDAQ market-makers set and maintained wide spreads pursuant to an industry-wide conspiracy. Litigation took nearly four years and was eventually settled for $1.027 billion, which was the largest antitrust recovery up to that point.

See also
 Electronic communication network
 List of class action lawsuits

References

Class action lawsuits
Law articles needing an infobox